VV03 may refer to:
 Kien An Airport, an airport in Haiphong, Vietnam, with ICAO code VV03
 Vega flight VV03, the  Vega launch that occurred on 30 April 2014